The black-headed oriole (Oriolus larvatus) is a species of bird in the family Oriolidae. It is found in Africa and has a very striking appearance with a bright yellow body, contrasting black head and flesh-coloured beak.

Taxonomy and systematics
Some authorities have considered the mountain oriole to be a subspecies of the black-headed oriole. Alternate names for the black-headed oriole include the African black-headed oriole, Eastern black-headed oriole and Eastern oriole.

Subspecies
Five subspecies are recognized: 
 O. l. rolleti - Salvadori, 1864: Originally described as a separate species. Found from southern Sudan and southern Ethiopia to eastern Democratic Republic of Congo and central Kenya
 O. l. reichenowi - Zedlitz, 1916: Found from Somalia to eastern Tanzania
 Kenya black-headed oriole (O. l. angolensis) - Neumann, 1905: Found from Angola and Namibia to western Tanzania and northern Mozambique
 O. l. tibicen - Lawson, 1962: Found from coastal southern Tanzania to coastal southern Mozambique
 O. l. larvatus - Lichtenstein, MHK, 1823: Found from southern Zimbabwe to inland southern Mozambique and eastern South Africa

Description
The black-headed oriole has a bright yellow body, contrasting black head and flesh-coloured beak. The voice is a liquid-sounding warble, accompanied by imitations and whistles.

Distribution and habitat
It breeds in much of sub-Saharan Africa from South Sudan and Ethiopia in the north to South Africa in the south.

It inhabits dry tropical forests, especially acacia and broad-leaved woodlands, and dense shrubland areas, where it is more often heard than seen despite the brightness of its plumage.

Behaviour and ecology
The black-headed oriole forages in the canopy, feeding on small fruit as well as large insects. The young are fed mostly with caterpillars.

Gallery

References

External links
Black-headed oriole videos, photos and sounds - Internet Bird Collection
 Black-headed oriole - Species text in The Atlas of Southern African Birds.

black-headed oriole
black-headed oriole
Birds of Sub-Saharan Africa
black-headed oriole